Joseph-Irénée-René Hamel (February 9, 1910 – December 16, 1982) was a local politician in Quebec, Canada.  He served as Member of the Canadian Parliament and as Member of the Legislative Assembly of Quebec.

Early life

He was born in 1910 in Grand-Mère, Quebec, Mauricie.

World War II politics

During World War II Hamel joined the Bloc Populaire Canadien, a political party that opposed conscription.  He was the party’s provincial candidate in the district of Saint-Maurice in 1944, but lost the election against Marc Trudel.  The following year though, he successfully ran in the federal district of Saint-Maurice—Laflèche.  After the war, the party quickly dissolved and by 1949 Hamel was sitting as an Independent MP.  He lost re-election in that same year.

Fighting Duplessis

Hamel, who opposed Premier Maurice Duplessis, made a political comeback in 1952.  Benefiting from a strong support among Shawinigan’s labor class population, he was elected Liberal Member of the Legislative Assembly for the district of Saint-Maurice.  Hamel became one of the most effective Liberal floor leaders.

In order to pressure voters into defeating Hamel, Duplessis refused to authorize the construction of a new bridge between Shawinigan and Shawinigan-Sud.  Local Liberals jokingly claimed that they would rather swim than support Duplessis. Nonetheless, Hamel was narrowly re-elected against Shawinigan mayor Gaston Hardy in 1956.

Hamel was also a candidate for the 1958 Quebec Liberal Party leadership convention, but was defeated by Jean Lesage.

Member of the Cabinet

In 1960 the Liberals won the provincial election and Lesage became Premier.  Shawinigan got a new bridge.  Hamel was appointed to the Cabinet.  He was Minister of Municipal Affairs from 1960 to 1961, Minister of Labour from 1960 to 1963 and Attorney General from 1963 to 1964.

After retirement from politics

In 1964, Hamel was appointed Judge and resigned his legislative and executive functions.

He died in Shawinigan in 1982.

See also
Mauricie
Saint-Maurice Legislators
Saint-Maurice—Champlain Federal Electoral District
Saint-Maurice Provincial Electoral District
Shawinigan, Quebec

Footnotes

1910 births
1982 deaths
Bloc populaire canadien MPs
Members of the House of Commons of Canada from Quebec
People from Shawinigan
Quebec Liberal Party MNAs
Université Laval alumni